The men's cruiserweight (86 kg/189.2 lbs) Full-Contact category at the W.A.K.O. World Championships 2007 in Coimbra was the third heaviest of the male Full-Contact tournaments involving eleven fighters from three continents (Europe, Asia and North America).  Each of the matches was three rounds of two minutes each and were fought under Full-Contact rules.

As there were not enough men for a tournament designed for sixteen, five of the men received a bye through to the quarter final stage.  The tournament gold medallist was Sergey Bogdan from Russia who defeated Sweden's Sadibou Sy by split decision in the final.  Defeated semi finalists Mairis Briedis from Latvia and Sergio Goncalves from Portugal received bronze medals.

Results

Key

See also
List of WAKO Amateur World Championships
List of WAKO Amateur European Championships
List of male kickboxers

References

External links
 WAKO World Association of Kickboxing Organizations Official Site

Kickboxing events at the WAKO World Championships 2007 Coimbra
2007 in kickboxing
Kickboxing in Portugal